Douglas Turner Ward (May 5, 1930February 20, 2021) was an American playwright, actor, director, and theatrical producer.  He was noted for being a founder and artistic director of the Negro Ensemble Company (NEC).  He was nominated for the Tony Award for Best Featured Actor in a Play in 1974 for his role in The River Niger, which he also directed.

Early life
Ward was born Roosevelt Ward Jr. in Burnside, Louisiana, on May 5, 1930.  His parents, Roosevelt Ward and Dorothy (Short), were poor farmers who also owned a tailoring business.  They relocated to New Orleans when Ward was eight years old, and he went to Xavier University Preparatory School.  He was accepted by Wilberforce University in 1946, before transferring to the University of Michigan.  He majored in politics and theater, but dropped out of college at the age of 19 and relocated to New York City.  There, he became friends with Lorraine Hansberry and Lonne Elder III.

Ward became a member of the Progressive Party at the end of the 1940s and aligned himself on the left of the political spectrum.  He was imprisoned in New Orleans while appealing his conviction for draft evasion.  After his conviction was reversed, he returned to New York and worked as a reporter for the Daily Worker.  Ward also joined the Paul Mann Actors Workshop to study theater.  He subsequently adopted the stage name Douglas Turner Ward, a tribute to his two role models: Frederick Douglass and Nat Turner.

Career 
As an actor, Turner made one of his first performances in The Iceman Cometh by Eugene O'Neill in 1956, at the Circle in the Square Theatre.  Three years later, he made his Broadway debut in a small role in A Raisin in the Sun, alongside Sidney Poitier and Claudia McNeil.  His first significant artistic achievement would be as a playwright, however.

Happy Ending/Day of Absence, a program of two one-act plays, premiered at the St. Mark's Playhouse in Manhattan on November 15, 1965.  It ultimately ran for 504 performances over 15 months, enduring through the 1966 transit strike.  That same year, Ward authored an opinion piece in The New York Times titled "American Theater: For Whites Only?"  The piece garnered a grant from W. McNeil Lowry of the Ford Foundation. He later received his first Drama Desk Award for outstanding new playwright.

Ward was one of the founders of the Negro Ensemble Company in 1967, and served for many years as its artistic director.   It notably produced The River Niger (1972), which won the Tony Award for Best Play in 1974 and was adapted as a film of the same name two years later.  Ward himself acted in and directed that play, receiving a nomination for Best Featured Actor in a Play.  The company also produced Home (1979) by Samm-Art Williams and A Soldier's Play (1981) by Charles Fuller.  The latter won the Pulitzer Prize for Drama and was adapted into the film A Soldier's Story.

Ward was enshrined into the American Theater Hall of Fame in 1996.  He was also conferred the Martin Luther King Jr. Humanitarian Award.  He published The Haitian Chronicles in March 2020, having worked on the three-play series for around four decades.  He viewed the series, which focused on the Haitian Revolution, as his magnum opus and intended to have it staged by NEC alumni.

Personal life
Ward married Diana Powell Ward in 1966.  Together, they had two children: Elizabeth Ward–Cuprill and Douglas Powell Ward.

Ward died on February 20, 2021, at his home in Manhattan.  He was 90.

Selected credits

Theatre

Directing

Writing

Acting

Awards and nominations
1966 Drama Desk Award for Happy Ending and Day of Absence
1968 Drama Desk Award (with Robert Hooks and Gerald S. Krone, Negro Ensemble Company)
1969 Drama Desk Award (Outstanding Performance) for Ceremonies in Dark Old Men
1969 Tony Award Special Award (with Robert Hooks and Gerald S. Krone, Negro Ensemble Company)
1974 Tony Award, Best Play (with Robert Hooks and Gerald S. Krone, Negro Ensemble Company) for The River Niger
1974 Tony Award nomination, Best Featured Actor in a Play for The River Niger
1976 Tony Award nomination, Best Play (with Robert Hooks and Gerald S. Krone, Negro Ensemble Company) for The First Breeze of Summer
1979 Drama Desk Award nomination, Outstanding New Play (with Robert Hooks and Gerald S. Krone, Negro Ensemble Company) for Nevis Mountain Dew
1982 Drama Desk Award nomination, Outstanding New Play (with Robert Hooks and Gerald S. Krone, Negro Ensemble Company) for A Soldier's Play
1982 Drama Desk Award nomination, Outstanding Director of a Play for A Soldier's Play

References

External links

Excerpt from Day of Absence at the National Humanities Center
Stuart A. Rose Manuscript, Archives, and Rare Book Library, Emory University:  Douglas Turner Ward papers, circa 1957–2012

1930 births
2021 deaths
20th-century American dramatists and playwrights
African-American dramatists and playwrights
Drama Desk Award winners
Tony Award winners
Obie Award recipients
People from Ascension Parish, Louisiana
Progressive Party (United States, 1948) politicians
Writers from Louisiana
University of Michigan alumni
20th-century African-American writers
21st-century African-American people